Peperomia cookiana, is a species of plant in the genus Peperomia. It is endemic to Hawaiian Islands.

Accepted varieties
Apart from the basic Peperomia cookiana, four varieties are currently known:
 Peperomia cookiana var. flavinervia (C.DC.) Yunck.
 Peperomia cookiana  var. minutilimba Yunck.
 Peperomia cookiana var. ovatilimba (C.DC.) Yunck.
 Peperomia cookiana  var. pukooana (C.DC.) Yunck.

References

cookiana
Endemic flora of Hawaii